Freedom Dreamer is the ninth CD single by Minori Chihara. The single was released under GloryHeaven, a joint label division between Lantis and Sony Music Distribution (Japan) Inc. and placed ninth on the Oricon charts in the month it debuted.

Track listing
"Freedom Dreamer" lyrics by Minori Chihara, music by Daisuke Kikuta (Elements Garden) 
"Best mark smile"

References

Minori Chihara songs
Lantis (company) singles
2010 singles
2010 songs